The Milan Triennial X was the Triennial in Milan sanctioned by the Bureau of International Expositions (BIE) on the 5 November 1953.
Its theme was Prefabrication - Industrial Design. 
It was held at the Palazzo dell'Arte and ran from 
28 August 1954 to 22 November 1954. 

Timo Sarpaneva, Tapio Wirkkala and Dora Jung all won Grand Prix
with Rut Bryk, Kaj Franck and Toini Muona receiving honorable mentions.
Lisa Johansson-Pape, Göran Hongell,  Antti Nurmesniemi, Ilmari Tapiovaara, Yki Nummi, Bertel Gardberg, Friedl Kjellberg and Ico Parisi all won gold medals and 
Michael Schilkin and Saara Hopea silver ones.

References 

1954 in Italy
Tourist attractions in Milan
World's fairs in Milan